Events from the year 1938 in Denmark.

Incumbents
 Monarch – Christian X
 Prime minister – Thorvald Stauning

Events

Sports

Football
 B 1903 wins their fourth Danish football championship by winning the 1937–38 Danish Championship League,

Swimming
 613 August Denmark wins five gold medals, one silver medal and one bronze medal at the 1938 European Aquatics Championships.

Births
 18 July  – Erik Wedersøe, actor (died 2011)
 1 September – Per Kirkeby. painter, sculptor (died 2018)
 11 October – Merete Ries, publisher (died 2018)
 15 November – Henning Camre, cinematographer, film industry administrator

Deaths
 16 April – Karl Madsen, art historian, painter and arts administrator (born 1855)
 9 May – Thomas B. Thrige, businessman (born 1866)
 2 July – Lau Lauritzen Sr., film director, screenwriter and actor (born 1878)

References

 
Denmark
Years of the 20th century in Denmark
1930s in Denmark
1938 in Europe